Cimolomys is a mammal genus from the Upper Cretaceous of North America. It was a member of the extinct order Multituberculata within the suborder Cimolodonta and family Cimolomyidae.

The genus Cimolomys was named by Othniel Charles Marsh in 1889.

Species
 
The species Cimolomys clarki was named by Sahni in 1972. Fossil remains were found in Campanian-Maastrichtian (Upper Cretaceous) strata of Texas and Wyoming (United States). Possible remains have also come from New Jersey (USA). It probably weighed about 300 g, the same as a malnourished rat.

The species Cimolomys gracilis was named by Marsh O.C. in 1889, and has also been known as Cimolomys digona (Marsh 1889); Meniscoessus brevis; Ptilodus  gracilus (Osborn H.F. 1893); and Selenacodon brevis (Marsh 1889). Remains were found in Maastrichtian (Upper Cretaceous) strata of Montana, South Dakota and Wyoming (USA) and Saskatchewan, Canada. This species likely weighed around 415 g, as much as a modern rat.

The species Cimolomys milliensis was named by Eaton J.G. in 1993.. Remains were found in Campanian (Upper Cretaceous) strata of Mill Creek, Utah (USA).

The species Cimolomys trochuus was named by Lillegraven J.A. in 1969. Remains were found in Maastrichtian (Upper Cretaceous) strata of North America. The holotype is in the collection of the University of Alberta.

References 
 Marsh (1889), "Discovery of Cretaceous Mammalia". Am. J. Sci 3, 18 & 38: p. 177-180
 Kielan-Jaworowska Z & Hurum JH (2001), "Phylogeny and Systematics of multituberculate mammals". Paleontology 44, p. 389-429
 Much of this information has been derived from   MESOZOIC MAMMALS; "basal" Cimolodonta, Cimolomyidae, Boffiidae and Kogaionidae, an Internet directory

Cimolodonts
Cretaceous mammals of North America
Hell Creek fauna
Prehistoric mammal genera